1922 is a 1978 Greek drama film directed by Nikos Koundouros about the Greek genocide based on the autobiography of Greek novelist Elias Venezis, the Number 31328. The film is set in and around Smyrna (Izmir) at the time the Turkish army entered the city in 1922, and follows the suffering of ethnic Greeks held as prisoners.

Cast
 Antigoni Amanitou - Loukia
 Zaharias Rohas - Ilias
 Nikos Kapios
 Vasilis Kolovos
 Katerina Gogou - actress
 Minas Hatzisavvas
 Olga Tournaki - Ilias's mother

References

External links

1978 drama films
1978 films
1970s biographical drama films
Greek biographical drama films
1970s Greek-language films